Mark Gottlieb may refer to:

 Mark Gottlieb (politician) (born 1956), member of the Wisconsin State Assembly
 Mark Gottlieb (Neighbours), a character from the Australian soap opera Neighbours